Ait Sedrate Jbel El Soufla is a commune in the Ouarzazate Province of the Drâa-Tafilalet administrative region of Morocco. At the time of the 2004 census, the commune had a total population of 4471 people living in 650 households.

References

Populated places in Ouarzazate Province
Rural communes of Drâa-Tafilalet